Kesabpur is a census town in Domjur CD Block of Howrah Sadar subdivision in Howrah district in the Indian state of West Bengal. It is a part of Kolkata Urban Agglomeration.

Demographics
As per 2011 Census of India Kesabpur had a total population of 12,073 of which 6,130 (51%) were males and 5,953 (49%) were females. Population below 6 years was 1,369. The total number of literates in Kesabpur was 8,623 (80.56% of the population over 6 years).

 India census, Kesabpur had a population of 10,356. Males constitute 51% of the population and females 49%. Kesabpur has an average literacy rate of 66%, higher than the national average of 59.5%: male literacy is 71% and female literacy is 61%. In Kesabpur, 13% of the population is under 6 years of age.

Transport
Domjur Road railway station and Sankrail railway station are the nearest railway stations.

References

Cities and towns in Howrah district
Neighbourhoods in Kolkata
Kolkata Metropolitan Area